Sailors Gully is an inner suburb of the regional city of Bendigo in north central Victoria, Australia,  north west of the Bendigo city centre.

References

External links

Towns in Victoria (Australia)
Bendigo